Donald McNaughton may refer to:
 Donald McNaughton (Canadian general) (born 1934), Canadian general
 Donald McNaughton (New York politician) (1830–1893), American politician
 Domhnall MacNeachdainn (died 1440), dean and bishop